Villalangua is a locality located in the municipality of Las Peñas de Riglos, in Huesca province, Aragon, Spain. As of 2020, it has a population of 14.

Geography 
Villalangua is located 55km northwest of Huesca.

References

Populated places in the Province of Huesca